Kostel may refer to:

 Kostel, Kostel, a settlement in the Municipality of Kostel, Slovenia
 Municipality of Kostel, Slovenia
 Kostel, Croatia, a village near Pregrada, Croatia
 Kostel, German name of the Czech town of Podivín
 Kostel Pribićki, a village near Krašić, Croatia
 Kostel, Bulgaria, a village in Elena Municipality
 Pietrapelosa